The Red Pheasant Cree Nation is a Plains Cree First Nations band government in the Canadian province of Saskatchewan.

History 
Chief Wuttunee's people were living along the Battle River when the Numbered Treaties were being negotiated. Wuttunee did not want to sign Treaty 6 but appointed his brother Red Pheasant to sign in his place, and the Department of Indian Affairs henceforth referred to them as the Red Pheasant Band.

In 1878, they settled on a reserve in the Eagle Hills. A day school and an Anglican church were opened there within a decade.

In 2019, Chief Wuttunee secured the return of the original treaty medal which had been stolen in 1890 off the body of a deceased Chief.

In 2020, Chief Clinton Wuttunee was re-elected to the position of Chief. However, his election and that of one other band councilor were annulled amid substantiated allegations of electoral fraud, including vote buying. This decision was appealed to the Federal Court of Appeal by Chief Wuttunee and the other band councilor on the basis that any vote buying conducted by them had not been decisive in the election. The appellate court affirmed the annulment of the election, noting the lower court's finding that "Chief Wuttunee and Councillor Nicotine had occupied leadership positions within the RPFN, and that, as such, they were supposed to lead by example. Instead of acting as “bulwarks of First Nation democracy”, however, they endeavoured to corrupt the democratic process."

Demographics 
The band has 2,536 registered members, 821 of whom live on the reserve or other band lands and 1,715 live off reserve.

Notable people
 Alex Decoteau, Olympian; first Aboriginal police officer in Canada
 Don Francks (Iron Buffalo), actor, vocalist and jazz musician
 William Wuttunee a controversial lawyer founded the National Indian Council (NIC) in 1961 to represent their peoples of Canada, including treaty/status Indians, non-status Indians, and the Métis. This was the forerunner of the National Indian Brotherhood and the Assembly of First Nations. First First Nations lawyer in Western Canada. 
 Gerald McMaster, artist, author, and curator
 Dr Robert-Falcon Ouellette, university professor, soldier, federal politician and first Chair of the All Party Indigenous Parliamentarian Caucus in Ottawa. 
 Chief Poundmaker (Pîhtokahanapiwiyin), Plains Cree chief known for his role in the North-West Rebellion
 Cree Summer, American actress raised on the Red Pheasant reserve
 Michelle Good, author, winner of the Governor General's Award for English-language fiction in 2020 for Five Little Indians
 Allen Sapp, Plains Cree Artist, OC, SOM, Grand Nephew of Chief Poundmaker, Grandson of Flying Eagle
 Colten Boushie, Youth killed by local farmer, Gerald Stanley. Not guilty verdict sparked outrage and changes to justice system.
 Dr Winston Wuttunee, Elder, acclaimed musician, winner of an Indspire Awards for culture and spirituality, First Elder to work in the House of Commons.
 Dr Wanda Wuttunee university professor of business, former department head of Native Studies at the University of Manitoba.

References 

 Thompson, Christian. Red Pheasant First Nation. Encyclopedia of Saskatchewan. 2006.

Cree governments
First Nations governments in Saskatchewan